Patrice L'Heureux (1 February 1972 – 7 October 2018) was a Canadian professional boxer.

Amateur
L'Heureux participated in the 1999 Pan American Games but was knocked out by Alexis Rubalcaba.

Professional career
On 13 November 2004, L'Heureux challenged Steve McKay (record 5–1) for the vacant Canadian heavyweight championship in Montreal. After knocking down McKay in the eighth round with a body shot, L'Heureux then knocked him out for good 27 seconds into the ninth round. However, in his first fight after winning the prestigious title in 2005, L'Heureux was viciously pummelled by American clubfighter Steve Pannell (33-8) to lose his undefeated ring record by a technical knock out at 2:31 of the first round. He beat undefeated Olympian Art Binkowski on points later that year.

The 6-foot 5-inch tall right-hander suffered his second loss when he was knocked out in the seventh round by David Cadieux on 12 May 2006. He lost the rematch on points. On 26 May 2007, he suffered his fourth loss to the undefeated Alexander Povetkin by a knockout in the secondnd round. L'Heureux subsequently won four straight fights including two fights against Stephane Tessier. His first fight with Tessier earned L'Heureux the Quebec Boxing Council (CQB) Heavyweight Title. He died of a heart attack on 7 October 2018, aged 46.

Professional boxing record

|-
| style="text-align:center;" colspan="8"|24 Wins (13 knockouts, 11 decisions), 5 Losses (4 knockouts, 1 decision), 1 Draw 
|-  style="text-align:center; background:#e3e3e3;"
|  style="border-style:none none solid solid; "|Result
|  style="border-style:none none solid solid; "|Record
|  style="border-style:none none solid solid; "|Opponent
|  style="border-style:none none solid solid; "|Type
|  style="border-style:none none solid solid; "|Round
|  style="border-style:none none solid solid; "|Date
|  style="border-style:none none solid solid; "|Location
|  style="border-style:none none solid solid; "|Notes
|- align=center
|Loss
|
|align=left| Wayne John
|TKO
|5
|11 June 2010
|align=left| Montreal, Quebec, Canada
|align=left|
|-
|Win
|
|align=left| Stephane Tessier
|SD
|8
|14 May 2009
|align=left| Trois-Rivières, Quebec, Canada
|align=left|
|-
|Win
|
|align=left| Joe Stofle
|TKO
|5
|4 April 2009
|align=left| Montreal, Quebec, Canada
|align=left|
|-
|Win
|
|align=left| Ken Murphy
|UD
|6
|5 April 2008
|align=left| Montreal, Quebec, Canada
|align=left|
|-
|Win
|
|align=left| Stephane Tessier
|UD
|8
|21 September 2007
|align=left| Trois-Rivières, Quebec, Canada
|align=left|
|-
|Loss
|
|align=left| Alexander Povetkin
|KO
|2
|26 May 2007
|align=left| Bamberg, Germany
|align=left|
|-
|Loss
|
|align=left| David Cadieux
|UD
|12
|18 November 2006
|align=left| Trois-Rivières, Quebec, Canada
|align=left|
|-
|Win
|
|align=left| Travis Fulton
|TKO
|3
|30 September 2006
|align=left| Montreal, Quebec, Canada
|align=left|
|-
|Loss
|
|align=left| David Cadieux
|KO
|7
|12 May 2006
|align=left| Shawinigan, Quebec, Canada
|align=left|
|-
|Win
|
|align=left| Josh Gutcher
|KO
|1
|12 November 2005
|align=left| Montreal, Quebec, Canada
|align=left|
|-
|Win
|
|align=left| Troy Weida
|TKO
|3
|12 October 2005
|align=left| Grand-Mère, Quebec, Canada
|align=left|
|-
|Win
|
|align=left| Art Binkowski
|UD
|10
|18 June 2005
|align=left| Montreal, Quebec, Canada
|align=left|
|-
|Win
|
|align=left| Marcos Celestino
|TKO
|2
|14 May 2005
|align=left| Montreal, Quebec, Canada
|align=left|
|-
|Win
|
|align=left| Adenilson Rodrigues
|TKO
|2
|9 April 2005
|align=left| Montreal, Quebec, Canada
|align=left|
|-
|Loss
|
|align=left| Steve Pannell
|TKO
|1
|26 February 2005
|align=left| Hull, Quebec, Canada
|align=left|
|-
|Win
|
|align=left| Steve MacKay
|TKO
|9
|13 November 2004
|align=left| Montreal, Quebec, Canada
|align=left|
|-
|Win
|
|align=left| Garing Lane
|UD
|8
|11 September 2004
|align=left| Montreal, Quebec, Canada
|align=left|
|-
|Win
|
|align=left| Jose Arimatea Da Silva
|UD
|8
|24 April 2004
|align=left| Quebec City, Canada
|align=left|
|-
|Win
|
|align=left| Marcus Harden
|KO
|3
|20 December 2003
|align=left| Montreal, Quebec, Canada
|align=left|
|-
|Win
|
|align=left| Charles Brown
|UD
|8
|22 November 2003
|align=left| Montreal, Quebec, Canada
|align=left|
|-
|Win
|
|align=left| Tali Kulihaapai
|TKO
|3
|24 May 2003
|align=left| Reno, Nevada, U.S.
|align=left|
|-
|Win
|
|align=left| Ritchie Goosehead
|TKO
|1
|28 February 2003
|align=left| Granby, Quebec, Canada
|align=left|
|-
|Draw
|
|align=left| Willie Chapman
|PTS
|4
|15 February 2003
|align=left| Laughlin, Nevada, U.S.
|align=left|
|-
|Win
|
|align=left| Billy Zumbrun
|TKO
|4
|13 October 2002
|align=left| Choctaw, Mississippi, U.S.
|align=left|
|-
|Win
|
|align=left| Charles Spear
|TKO
|2
|6 September 2002
|align=left| Montreal, Quebec, Canada
|align=left|
|-
|Win
|
|align=left| Shane Sutcliffe
|UD
|6
|30 November 2001
|align=left| Montreal, Quebec, Canada
|align=left|
|-
|Win
|
|align=left| Dean Storey
|UD
|4
|5 June 2001
|align=left| Trois-Rivières, Quebec, Canada
|align=left|
|-
|Win
|
|align=left| Marcelo Aravena
|UD
|4
|2 March 2001
|align=left| Montreal, Quebec, Canada
|align=left|
|-
|Win
|
|align=left| Conrad Browne
|TKO
|3
|8 September 2000
|align=left| Montreal, Quebec, Canada
|align=left|
|-
|Win
|
|align=left| Ritchie Goosehead
|DQ
|4
|6 May 2000
|align=left| Maniwaki, Quebec, Canada
|align=left|
|}

Football career
L'Heureux is a former Canadian football player with the Diablos of Trois-Rivières in Quebec.

References

External links
 
 

1972 births
2018 deaths
French Quebecers
Heavyweight boxers
Sportspeople from Shawinigan
Place of death missing
Canadian male boxers
Commonwealth Games competitors for Canada
Boxers at the 1998 Commonwealth Games
Pan American Games competitors for Canada
Boxers at the 1999 Pan American Games